The Jordan Historic District is a Registered Historic District in Jordan, Minnesota, United States, that includes brick commercial and social buildings from the mid-to-late nineteenth century.

References

Buildings and structures in Scott County, Minnesota
Historic districts on the National Register of Historic Places in Minnesota
National Register of Historic Places in Scott County, Minnesota